Paul Goddard may refer to:
Paul Goddard (footballer) (born 1959), English footballer
Paul Goddard (actor), English-Australian actor and economist
Paul Beck Goddard (1811–1866), American inventor
Paul Goddard, member of 1970s American rock group Atlanta Rhythm Section